Massachusetts elected its members November 4, 1822. Massachusetts law required a majority for election, which was not met in 3 districts, necessitating additional elections on March 3, 1823, and May 12, 1823; nevertheless, all elections were complete before the new Congress convened.

See also 
 1823 Massachusetts's 10th congressional district special election
 1824 Massachusetts's 10th congressional district special election
 1822 and 1823 United States House of Representatives elections
 List of United States representatives from Massachusetts

Notes 

1822
Massachusetts
Massachusetts
United States House of Representatives
United States House of Representatives